St Patrick's College (Irish: Coláiste Phádraig Droichead na Banna) is a Catholic maintained secondary school located in Banbridge, County Down, Northern Ireland.

History
The foundation stone for St. Patrick's Intermediate School was laid on 1 May 1957 by Bishop O'Doherty and the school welcomed its first pupils in September 1958.  Its name was changed to St. Patrick's High School in 1972 as a result of the raising of the school-leaving age. It was again changed to St. Patrick's College to reflect the increased numbers of students staying on to complete their GCSE A-Levels.

Facilities
The school recently had a full-size 3G GAA pitch with floodlights and changing rooms added to its sporting facilities. This was funded by a grant of £1.5 million from several agencies including Peace 4, the Armagh, Banbridge and Craigavon District Council and Sport NI.

Academics
The full range of subjects is offered.   At GCSE A-level, the students can choose from Geography, Art, Biology, Technology and Design, English Literature, Psychology, Drama and Theatre Studies, Software Systems and Development, Chemistry, Agriculture, History, Journalism, Physics, Government and Politics, and Religious Studies.  They can also take BTEC Level 3 National Diploma in Information Technology, Engineering, Childcare, Performing Arts, Public Services, Media, and Sport.

The college has been the best performing non-selective school in County Down for several years.  It has also been listed as among the top ten non-grammar schools in Northern Ireland.  In 2018, 97% of pupils received five or more GCSE A* - C passes.

Shared education
The college works in partnership with the neighbouring Banbridge High School to offer a number of shared activities as part of the curriculum.  It is also part of the Banbridge Area Learning Community coordinated by the Southern Regional College.

Extra-curricular
The college offers the opportunity to participate in various sporting activities including swimming, netball, Gaelic football (Boys and girls), camogie, hurling, rugby, basketball, dance, and athletics.  The college also has an active music programme including opportunities in singing and musical instruments.

Awards
In 2020, the college was awarded Intermediate level of the British Council's International School Award in recognition of its work to bring the world into the classroom.

See also
 List of secondary schools in Northern Ireland

References

1958 establishments in Northern Ireland
Educational institutions established in 1958
Secondary schools in County Down
Catholic secondary schools in Northern Ireland
Banbridge